The Cabinet of the United States, which is the principal advisory body to the president of the United States, has had 38 permanent female members serving as vice president or head of one of the federal executive departments and 31 women as cabinet-level officials, which can differ under each president. Of that number, one woman was elected vice president, three were appointed to the helm of multiple different departments, and four served both as Cabinet and Cabinet-rank officeholders. No woman held a Cabinet position before the ratification of the 19th Amendment in 1920, which prohibits states and the federal government from denying any citizen the right to vote because of that citizen's sex.

Frances Perkins became the first woman to serve in a president's cabinet when she was appointed secretary of labor by President Franklin D. Roosevelt in 1933. Patricia Roberts Harris was the first African-American woman and the first woman of color to serve in a presidential cabinet when she was named secretary of housing and urban development by President Jimmy Carter in 1977. Two years later, Carter tapped her for secretary of health and human services, thus making her the first woman to hold two different cabinet positions. Madeleine Albright, who was born in Czechoslovakia, became the first foreign-born woman to serve in the presidential cabinet when President Bill Clinton picked her for the cabinet-rank position of United States ambassador to the United Nations in 1993. She subsequently served as secretary of state during Clinton's second term, which made her the highest-ranking woman in any presidential administration at the time.

On January 26, 2005, Condoleezza Rice was appointed secretary of state, which is first in the United States presidential line of succession among Cabinet secretaries, which in turn makes her the highest-ranking woman in the federal government's history. On January 4, 2007, Nancy Pelosi replaced Rice as the highest-ranking woman in line when she was elected speaker of the House. On January 20, 2021, Kamala Harris overtook Pelosi and became the highest-ranking woman in the line of succession when she was inaugurated as vice president.

President Joe Biden named the most women as secretaries to his first-term Cabinet, with five: former U.S. representative Marcia Fudge (D-OH) as secretary of housing and urban development; Michigan governor Jennifer Granholm as secretary of energy; U.S. representative Deb Haaland (D-NM) as secretary of the interior; Rhode Island governor Gina Raimondo as secretary of commerce; and Federal Reserve chair Janet Yellen as secretary of the treasury, exceeding by one the record set by President Barack Obama. However, including cabinet reshuffles
during his second term in office, Obama still holds the record for most women appointed to permanent cabinet positions with eight, the most of any presidency, therefore surpassing George W. Bush's previous record of six appointees.

The Department of Labor has had the most female secretaries, with seven. The Department of Health and Human Services has had five; the Department of Commerce has had four; the departments of Education, Housing and Urban Development, Interior, State, and Transportation have had three; the departments of Energy, Homeland Security, and Justice have had two; and the departments of Agriculture and Treasury have had one. The departments of Defense and Veterans Affairs are the only existing executive departments that do not have female secretaries yet.

The totals for this list include only women presidential appointees confirmed (if necessary) by the United States Senate to cabinet or cabinet-level positions and taking their oath of office; they do not include acting officials or nominees awaiting confirmation.

Permanent Cabinet members
The following list includes women who have held permanent Cabinet positions, all of whom are in the line of succession to the Presidency. The table below is organized based on the beginning of their terms in office. Officeholders whose terms begin the same day are ranked according to presidential order of succession.

 denotes the first female holder of that particular office

Former permanent Cabinet members 
 The Secretary of War became defunct when the Department of War was split between the Department of the Army and the Department of the Air Force by the National Security Act of 1947, and both were absorbed into the Department of Defense in 1949. No woman had ever served while it was a Cabinet post.
 The Postmaster General ceased to be a member of the Cabinet when the Post Office Department was re-organized into the United States Postal Service (USPS) by the Postal Reorganization Act. No woman had ever served while it was a Cabinet post. Megan Brennan became the first woman to serve as Postmaster General in 2015. She was appointed after USPS became an independent agency of the executive branch.
 The Secretary of Commerce and Labor became renamed when the Department of Commerce and Labor was split between the Department of Commerce and the Department of Labor. The Department of Commerce is considered a continuation of the Department of Commerce and Labor under a new name. No woman had ever served under the original title of the position.
 The Secretary of the Army ceased to be a member of the Cabinet when the Department of the Army became a component of the Department of Defense in 1949. No woman had ever served while it was a Cabinet post. Christine Wormuth became the first woman to serve as Secretary of the Army in 2021. She was appointed after it became a position beneath the Secretary of Defense.
 The Secretary of the Navy ceased to be a member of the Cabinet when the Department of the Navy became a component of the Department of Defense in 1949. No woman had ever served while it was a Cabinet post. Susan Livingstone became the first woman to serve as acting Secretary of the Navy in 2003. She was appointed after it became a position beneath the Secretary of Defense.
 The Secretary of the Air Force ceased to be a member of the Cabinet when the Department of the Air Force became a component of the Department of Defense in 1949. No woman had ever served while it was a Cabinet post. Sheila Widnall became the first woman to serve as Secretary of the Air Force in 1993. She was appointed after it became a position beneath the Secretary of Defense.

Cabinet-level positions
The president may designate or remove additional officials as members of the Cabinet. These positions have not always been in the Cabinet, so some female officeholders may not be listed.

The following list includes women who have held Cabinet-level positions, which can vary under each president. They are not in the line of succession and are not necessarily officers of the United States. The table below is organized based on the beginning of their terms in office while it was raised to cabinet-level status. Officeholders whose terms begin the same day are ranked alphabetically by last name.

 denotes the first female holder of that particular office

See also
 List of African-American United States Cabinet members
 List of foreign-born United States Cabinet members
 List of Hispanic and Latino American United States Cabinet members

Notes

References

External links
The Cabinet - Provided by the White House. Retrieved  January 11, 2016.
Women Appointed to Presidential Cabinets - Produced by the Center for American Women and Politics, Eagleton Institute of Politics from Rutgers University. Retrieved May 4, 2019.
Women Members Who Became Cabinet Members and United States Diplomats - Provided by the U.S. House of Representatives, Office of the Historian.  Part of the History, Art & Archives, Women in Congress, 1917–2006 website. Retrieved January 11, 2016.

Cabinet
+
United States